Juan Carlos Castilla Gómez (born 10 June 1978) is a Spanish former footballer who played as a goalkeeper.

Club career
Born in Huelva, Andalusia, Castilla made his senior debut with local Recreativo de Huelva, but never had any chance to establish there. In 1999–2000's Segunda División he was only the third choice and made no appearances in the league whatsoever during his spell. Subsequently, he moved to the Segunda División B with Real Balompédica Linense, then spent a further two years at that level with Jerez CF.

Castilla joined UDA Gramenet still in division three in the summer of 2004, appearing in a total of 66 league matches including the unsuccessful promotion play-offs. Afterwards, he signed with UE Lleida also in Catalonia and in the third tier, where he also started most of the time.

In the 2008–09 season, Castilla started representing FC Cartagena, featuring sporadically in an eventual return of the club to the second division. In July 2010, after only playing twice during the campaign for the fifth-placed team – his league debut as a professional coming on 5 December 2009 in a 1–2 away loss against CD Numancia– he signed with third-tier side CF Palencia.

References

External links

1978 births
Living people
Footballers from Huelva
Spanish footballers
Association football goalkeepers
Segunda División players
Segunda División B players
Recreativo de Huelva players
Real Balompédica Linense footballers
UDA Gramenet footballers
UE Lleida players
FC Cartagena footballers
CF Palencia footballers
UD Logroñés players